The People's Republic of China competed at the 1998 Winter Olympics in Nagano, Japan.

Medalists

Biathlon

Women

Women's 4 × 7.5 km relay

 1 A penalty loop of 150 metres had to be skied per missed target.
 2 One minute added per missed target.

Cross-country skiing

Men

 1 Starting delay based on 10 km results. 
 C = Classical style, F = Freestyle

Women

 2 Starting delay based on 5 km results. 
 C = Classical style, F = Freestyle

Figure skating

Men

Women

Pairs

Freestyle skiing

Men

Women

Ice hockey

Women's tournament

Group stage
The First 4 teams (shaded green) advanced to medal round games.

|}

Bronze-medal game

Short track speed skating

Men

Women

Speed skating

Men

Women

References

 Official Olympic Reports
 International Olympic Committee results database
 Olympic Winter Games 1998, full results by sports-reference.com

Nations at the 1998 Winter Olympics
1998
Winter Olympics